Lacon discoideus is a species of click beetle native to eastern North America.

References

 Beetles described in 1801
Elateridae